Kevin R. Cope (born January 26, 1962) is the author of Seeing the Big Picture, a business self-improvement book. He is the co-founder and CEO of Acumen Learning, where he developed the Five Business Drivers model (Cash, Profit, Assets, Growth, and People), which was designed to help companies to improve employee engagement and to increase their business acumen.

Career 
In 2002, Cope partnered with Stephen M.R. Covey and Ram Charan to found Acumen Learning, a leadership training company. At Acumen Learning, Cope developed the Five Business Drivers model, which has been implemented by 18 of the Fortune 50 and is used to train more than 30,000 people in more than 30 countries annually. In 2011, Acumen Learning was ranked No. 1631 on the Inc. 5000 and in 2012, it received the Business of the Year Award from ISA – The Association of Learning Providers.

On March 4, 2012, Cope published Seeing the Big Picture: Business Acumen to Build Your Credibility, Career, and Company, which reached fourth place on the New York Times Best Seller List, the first place on The Wall Street Journal Best Seller List, and the first place on USA Today Best Seller List. He has also contributed articles to Fast Company, Chief Executive, TLNT, and Training Magazine.

Published works

Books 
 2012: Seeing the Big Picture: Business Acumen to Build Your Credibility Career and Company

Articles 
 Two Vital Steps For Fixing Your Employee Engagement Problem (Fast Company, December 2014)
 What Business Acumen Can Do For You (Training Magazine, June 2012)
 How to See The Big Picture, Without Losing Sight of The Details (Chief Executive, February 2012)
 Employees: The Best Companies Know They're the Foundation of Success (TLNT, February 2012)

References

External links 
 Kevin Cope – Official Website
 Acumen Learning Official Website

1962 births
Living people
Brigham Young University alumni
Writers from Utah
American business writers